Twin Lakes, California may refer to one of these communities:

Twin Lakes, California, in Santa Cruz County
Twin Lakes, Mono County, California

or to one of these lake pairs:
Twin Lakes (El Dorado County, California) in the Desolation Wilderness
Twin Lakes (Mammoth Lakes, California) in Mono County
Twin Lakes (Bridgeport, California) in Mono County